Kathleen Clarke (11 April 1878 – 29 September 1972) was a founder member of Cumann na mBan, a women's paramilitary organisation formed in Ireland in 1914, and one of very few privy to the plans of the Easter Rising in 1916. She was the wife of Tom Clarke and sister of Ned Daly, both of whom were executed for their part in the Rising. She was subsequently a Teachta Dála (TD) and Senator with both Sinn Féin and Fianna Fáil, and the first female Lord Mayor of Dublin (1939–1941).

Early life
Kathleen Daly was born in Limerick in 1878, the third daughter of Edward and Catherine Daly (nee O'Mara). She was born into a prominent Fenian family. Her paternal uncle, John Daly, a subsequent Mayor of Limerick, was at the time imprisoned for his political activities in Chatham and Portland Prisons in England. Her uncle was released in 1896 and returned home to Limerick. At this time Kathleen had started a drapery business having previously begun an apprenticeship. When Tom Clarke, who had been imprisoned with her uncle, was released in 1898 he travelled to Limerick to receive the Freedom of the City and stayed with the Daly family.

In 1901 she ceased her business in the city as she had decided to emigrate to the United States to join Tom who had been there since 1900, having secured work through his Fenian contacts. They married on 16 July 1901 in New York City and lived in both the Bronx and Brooklyn areas of the city. They had three children together. Through his contacts in the Clan na Gael and the Irish Republican Brotherhood (IRB), Tom Clarke continued to be involved in nationalist activity.  Kathleen joined the Gaelic League while in the US and they returned to Ireland in November 1907. They opened a tobaconnist shop, initially at 55 Amiens Street, and later a second at 75a Great Britain (now Parnell) Street, which they ran together.

Cumann na mBan
In 1914 she became a founder member of Cumann na mBan. Her husband forbade her permission to take an active part in the 1916 Easter Rising as she had orders regardless of how the events would unfold. As Tom Clarke was the first signatory of the Proclamation of the Irish Republic he was chosen to be executed for his part in the Easter Rising. Her younger brother, Ned Daly, was also executed for taking part in the rising. She visited both of them before they were executed. Kathleen was pregnant at the time but subsequently lost the baby. She was committed to a long term struggle for Irish independence: "Other risings left only despair, and efforts towards freedom left to the next generation. I would make every effort to keep the ball rolling, and in some way continue the fight for freedom, and not let it end with the Rising." After the Rising Michael Collins established contact with her while in prison in his attempts to re-build the IRB network. She also set up the Irish National Aid Fund to aid those who had family members killed or imprisoned as a result of the Easter Rising closely aided by Sorcha MacMahon.

Political career
 
She became a member of Sinn Féin and in 1917 was elected a member of the party's Executive. During the alleged "German Plot" she was arrested and imprisoned in Holloway Prison for eleven months. During the Irish War of Independence she served as a District Judge on the Republican Courts in Dublin. In 1919 she was elected as an Alderman for the Wood Quay and Mountjoy Wards of Dublin Corporation and served until the corporation was abolished in 1925. She was also active in the Irish White Cross.

She was elected unopposed as a Sinn Féin Teachta Dála (TD) to the Second Dáil at the 1921 elections for the Dublin Mid constituency. She argued against the Anglo-Irish Treaty in the Dáil debates in December 1921 and January 1922. She was not re-elected at the 1922 general election, however and supported the Anti-Treaty IRA during the Irish Civil War. She was arrested briefly by the Garda Síochána during this time and her shop in D'Olier Street, Dublin was frequently raided. In 1926 she became a founder member of Fianna Fáil and had to resign from Cumann na mBan. She was re-elected to the short-lived 5th Dáil at the June 1927 election as a Fianna Fáil member for the Dublin Mid constituency but lost her seat at the September 1927 election and did not regain it. She was elected as one of six Fianna Fáil Senators to the Free State Seanad (Senate) for nine years at the 1928 Seanad election under the leadership of Joseph Connolly. She would remain a member of the Seanad until it was abolished in 1936.

In 1930 she was elected to the re-constituted Dublin Corporation for Fianna Fáil along with Robert Briscoe, Seán T. O'Kelly, Thomas Kelly and Oscar Traynor. She served as the first Fianna Fáil Lord Mayor of Dublin, and the first female Lord Mayor,  from 1939 to 1941. She opposed the Constitution of Ireland as she felt that several of its sections would place women in a lower position that they had been afforded in the Proclamation of the Irish Republic. Following correspondence with Hanna Sheehy-Skeffington, she made her feelings public in the press. She was criticised by many in Fianna Fáil as a result and, while she resigned from the Thomas Clarke Cumann she remained a member of the Fianna Fáil Ard Chomhairle (national executive committee). She had previously opposed the Conditions of Employment Bill in the Seanad in 1935. While she did not support the IRA bombing campaign in England during World War II she appealed for IRA men sentenced to death by the Irish courts to be granted clemency. Ultimately this would lead to her breaking with the party completely after her term as Lord Mayor had finished in 1941. She also opposed the perceived centralisation of local government and the increased power of County and City Managers which had been introduced by Seán MacEntee. She declined to stand as a Fianna Fáil candidate at the 1943 general election. She helped found the Irish Red Cross while Lord Mayor of Dublin.

She contested the 1948 general election on behalf of Clann na Poblachta in Dublin North-East but was not elected, receiving only 1,419 (3.2%) votes.

Later life
In 1966, as part of the celebrations of the Easter Rising, she and other surviving relatives were awarded honorary doctorates of law by the National University of Ireland.
In the run up to the commemorations of the rising she wrote to then taoiseach Seán Lemass saying as “the only widow alive of the signatories of the 1916 Proclamation...I know more about the events both before and after the Rising than anyone now alive”. She wanted a central role in the celebrations and said that her husband, not Patrick Pearse, had been president of the Republic in 1916.

She said Pearse “wanted to grab what was due to others . . . surely Pearse should have been satisfied with the honour of Commander-in-Chief when he knew as much about commanding as my dog . . . I had not intended raising the issue in public but I shall be forced to come out very strongly in public if the powers that be attempt to declare Pearse as President”. In a taped interview made in 1968 she opined that Roger Casement was "... the aristocratic kind and he assumed that when he went into any movement, ipso facto, he was one of our leaders, if not the leader . . . and what could he know of Ireland, when he was all the time out of it.”

Following her death aged 94 in 1972 at a nursing home in Liverpool, she received the rare honour of a state funeral. She is buried at Deans Grange Cemetery, Dublin. She preferred to be known as Caitlín Bean Uí Chléirigh (Kathleen, Mrs Clarke) and had this inscription on her headstone. Her grand-niece, Helen Litton, edited her memoirs and her biography was published in 1991.

An apartment building in Ballybough is named after Clarke, 'Kathleen Clarke Place'.

References

External links
Interview with Kathleen Clarke – RTÉ Libraries and Archives
Kathleen Clarke file at Limerick City Library, Ireland
 Kathleen Daly Clarke Papers and Collection of Thomas Clarke and Irish Political Materials at John J. Burns Library, Boston College

 

1878 births
1972 deaths
Burials at Deans Grange Cemetery
Clann na Poblachta politicians
Cumann na mBan members
Early Sinn Féin TDs
Fianna Fáil TDs
Fianna Fáil senators
Lord Mayors of Dublin
Members of the 1928 Seanad
Members of the 1931 Seanad
Members of the 1934 Seanad
Members of the 2nd Dáil
Members of the 5th Dáil
People of the Irish War of Independence
Politicians from County Limerick
Women mayors of places in Ireland
20th-century women Teachtaí Dála
Women in war 1900–1945
Women in war in Ireland